Duncan Ross McCallum (1930 – November 27, 2006) was a Canadian football player who played for the Calgary Stampeders, Winnipeg Blue Bombers and Edmonton Eskimos.

References

1930 births
2006 deaths
Edmonton Elks players
People from Montérégie